The Elle is a 31.8 km long river in Normandy, a right bank affluent of the Vire.

Topography 
It crops north of Rouxeville. It joins the Vire at Neuilly-la-Forêt in the Marais du Cotentin et du Bessin between Bessin and Pays saint-lois.

Tributaries 

L'Elle has several affluents ~ among them:
one main affluent : the Rieu (12.2 km) which joins right bank at Lison. The Rieu collects the waters of the north-eastern part of the basin, located between those of the Aure (north) and the Vire (east) and a few of its tributaries to the south and the east.
le ruisseau de Branche (6.7 km) joins the Elle left bank at Saint-Jean-de-Savigny.

Communes 
 Rouxeville (spring source at 200 m),
 Saint-Germain-d'Elle,
 Bérigny, où se joignent des ramifications secondaires venant de Saint-Jean-des-Baisants et Notre-Dame-d'Elle,
 Saint-Georges-d'Elle (en limite est),
 Montfiquet (en limite ouest),
 Cerisy-la-Forêt,
 Sainte-Marguerite-d'Elle (en limite sud),
 Saint-Jean-de-Savigny (en limite nord),
 Saint-Clair-sur-l'Elle (en limite nord),
 Moon-sur-Elle,
 Airel,
 Lison (en limite ouest),
 Neuilly-la-Forêt (confluent avec la Vire),

References 

Rivers of Normandy
Rivers of France
Rivers of Calvados (department)